Erhan Afyoncu (born 1967, in Tokat) is a Turkish historian, writer, academician, television programmer and columnist. Rector of the National Defense University.

Personal life
He saw his primary and secondary education in Tokat, the place of birth. After graduating from Gazi Osman Paşa High School in 1984, Marmara University Atatürk Education Faculty Department of Social Studies Education Department began.

Career
He graduated in 1988 and started working as a research assistant in the same department a year later. He completed his master's degree with Necati Efendi History of Crime (Russian Sefaratname) thesis and completed his doctorate in 1997 with Defterhâne-i Âmire (XVI-XVIII. Centuries) in Ottoman Empire State Organization. He became assistant professor in 2000, associate professor in 2008, professor in 2014. In 2001, he moved to the Department of History of Science and Literature. In 2010, he became deputy head of the Department of History of Marmara University Faculty of Arts and Sciences. By 2016, Marmara University was the dean of the Faculty of Science and Literature. He made a history program called Back Room of History with Murat Bardakçı on Habertürk TV. He also wrote in the Haberturk History magazine, whose first issue appeared on May 30, 2010, but whose publication life ended on May 22, He also undertook the academic coordination of the magazine. On April 11, 2012, President Abdullah Gül was appointed as a member of the Board of Directors of Atatürk Culture, Language and History Higher Institution. In 2016, he was appointed to the rector of the National Defense University.

Works

 Das Osmanische Reich: Unverhüllt, Yeditepe Yayınevi.
 Kıbrıs Meselesi, Tarih Ve Tabiat Vakfı Yayınları (TATAV) - Ali Ahmetbeyoğlu, Erhan Afyoncu.
 Ermeni Meselesi Üzerine Araştırmalar, Tarih Ve Tabiat Vakfı Yayınları (TATAV) .
 Osmanlı'nın Hayaleti, Yeditepe Yayınevi.
 Ottoman Empire Unveiled, Yeditepe Yayınevi.
 Sorularla Osmanlı İmparatorluğu, Yeditepe Yayınevi.
 Osmanlı Tarihi Araştırma Rehberi, Yeditepe Yayınevi.
 Ermeni Meselesi Üzerine Araştırmalar, Tatav Yayınları.
 Fatih ve Fetih Albümü, Tatav Yayınları.
 Tanzimat Öncesi Osmanlı Tarihi Araştırma Rehberi, Yeditepe Yayınları.
 Osmanlı İmparatorluğu'nda Askeri İsyanlar ve Darbeler (Uğur Demir ve Ahmet Önal together), Yeditepe Yayınevi, İstanbul 2010 .
 Truvanın İntikamı, Yeditepe Yayınevi, İstanbul 2009, .
 Yavuz’un Küpesi, Yeditepe Yayınevi, Erhan Afyoncu, 2010, .
 Muhteşem Süleyman, Yeditepe Yayınevi, İstanbul 2011. 
 Fransa'ya Osmanlı Tokadı, Yeditepe Yayınevi, İstanbul 2011.
 Kanuni ve Şehzade Mustafa, Yeditepe Yayınevi, İstanbul 2012.
 Venedik Elçilerinin Raporlarına Göre Kanuni ve Pargalı İbrahim Paşa, Yeditepe Yayınevi, İstanbul 2012.
 Sahte Mesih (Sabatay Sevi and the Jews, the Founder of the Revolution in the Light of the Ottoman Documents), İstanbul 2013.
 İstanbul'un Kapısı Sultanbeyli Tarihi, (Vahdettin Engin, İlber Ortaylı ve Mehmet Mazak together), Yeditepe Yayınevi, İstanbul, 2013.
 Peçesi Düşen Osmanlı :Çince, Yeditepe Yayınevi, İstanbul, 2014.
 Son Dünya Düzeni, Yeditepe Yayınevi, İstanbul, 2014.
 Süleyman Şah Türbesi, Yeditepe Yayınevi, İstanbul, 2015, 
 Muhteşem Valide: Kösem Sultan, Yeditepe Yayınevi, İstanbul, 2015, 
 Turhan Sultan, Yeditepe Yayınevi, İstanbul, 2015,  (Uğur Demir together)
 Baltacı ve Katerina, Yeditepe Yayınevi, İstanbul, 2015,

References

1967 births
People from Tokat
Marmara University alumni
20th-century Turkish historians
Turkish columnists
Academic staff of Marmara University
Rectors of National Defense University (Turkey)
Living people
21st-century Turkish historians